Hylomecon vernalis, also known as the forest poppy, is a poppy of the Far East, ranging from Manchuria to Japan.

This poppy is a perennial that spreads via rhizomes, typically no taller than 30 cm. The pinnate leaves usually have five soft green leaflets, although three and seven occur as well, each with a shape ranging from lanceolate-oblong to rhombic, and a pattern of distinct teeth along the margins.  The flowers are bright yellow 3.5–5 cm across, starting out bowl-shaped, then flattening out with age.

Its typical habitat is moist shaded woodland, growing in accumulated humus.

Although generally considered a monotypic genus, the species is somewhat variable, and several variations have been named as separate species.

It is distributed in South Korea (north of Gyeonggi Province), Manchuria (China), Haerong River (Korea), and Yangjeon River.

References 

 Christopher Grey-Wilson, Poppies (Portland: Timber Press, 2000)  pp. 40–41

Papaveroideae
Monotypic Papaveraceae genera
Flora of Northeast Asia